Sadafli is a village in the Yevlakh Rayon of Azerbaijan.

References 

Populated places in Yevlakh District